María Josefa Alfonso Mingo (born 27 March 1940) is a Spanish actress. She has appeared in more than ninety films since 1962.

Filmography

Awards

Medals Circle of Cinematographic Writers

References

External links 

1940 births
Living people
Spanish film actresses
Actresses from Madrid
20th-century Spanish actresses
21st-century Spanish actresses